Colorado v. Bertine, 479 U.S. 367 (1987), was a case in which the Supreme Court of the United States held that the Fourth Amendment does not prohibit the State from proving charges with the evidence discovered during an inventory search.

This case is controlled by the principles governing inventory searches of automobiles and of an arrestee's personal effects, as set forth in South Dakota v. Opperman, and Illinois v. Lafayette, rather than those governing searches of closed trunks and suitcases conducted solely for the purpose of investigating criminal conduct. United States v. Chadwick, and Arkansas v. Sanders, distinguished.

See also 
 List of United States Supreme Court cases
 Lists of United States Supreme Court cases by volume
 List of United States Supreme Court cases by the Rehnquist Court

References

External links
 

United States Supreme Court cases
United States Supreme Court cases of the Rehnquist Court